Marian Nedkov Avramov (born 13 April 1965) is a Bulgarian wrestler. He competed in the men's freestyle 48 kg at the 1992 Summer Olympics.

References

1965 births
Living people
Bulgarian male sport wrestlers
Olympic wrestlers of Bulgaria
Wrestlers at the 1992 Summer Olympics
People from Kazanlak